Yanika Vartlaan (born 30 March 1999) is a retired Estonian-Ukrainian rhythmic gymnast. She is the 2018 Grand Prix Final hoop bronze medalist.

Personal life 
Yanika Vartlaan was born on 30 March 1999 in Donetsk. Her mother is Ukrainian, and her father is Estonian.

Career 
Vartlaan initially competed for Estonia, but she did not live or train in Estonia. She competed at the 2015 World Cup in Bucharest and finished 33rd in the all-around, and she finished 45th at the World Cup in Kazan. At the European Championships, the Estonian team of Vartlaan, Olga Bogdanova, and Viktoria Bogdanova finished 15th. She competed at the 2016 World Cup in Espoo and finished 27th in the all-around. She also competed at the World Cup in Minsk and finished 17th in the all-around. She won the all-around gold medal at the 2016 Estonian Championships.

In 2018, Vartlaan decided to switch from competing for Estonia to her native country, Ukraine. She competed at three events during the 2018 World Cup series. In Tashkent, she finished 21st in the all-around. In Portimao, she finished 10th in the all-around, and she qualified to the event finals in hoop where she finished 6th, clubs where she finished seventh, and ribbon where she finished sixth. Then in Minsk, she finished 15th in the all-around. She won the bronze medal in hoop at the 2018 Grand Prix Final in Marbella. She competed at the 2018 World Championships with Yeva Meleshchuk, and Vlada Nikolchenko, and they finished fifth as a team, and Vartlaan finished 22nd in the all-around final.

Vartlaan competed at the 2019 World Cup in Portimao where she finished 19th in the all-around. She competed at the Italian Serie A and B events in 2019, but she fell during her ribbon routine and injured her leg.

Vartlaan announced her retirement from the sport in August 2020.

References

Extrernal links 
 

1999 births
Living people
Ukrainian rhythmic gymnasts
Ukrainian people of Estonian descent
Sportspeople from Donetsk